Protogygia comstocki is a moth of the family Noctuidae. It is found in the White Sands National Park, Otero County, New Mexico as well as the Hanford Central and Wahluke dunes in Washington.

References

Noctuinae